Minna Nieminen (born 31 August 1976 in Lappeenranta) is a Finnish rower. She won a silver medal in the women's lightweight double sculls at the 2008 Summer Olympics.

External links
 
 
 

1976 births
Living people
Finnish female rowers
Olympic rowers of Finland
Rowers at the 2008 Summer Olympics
Olympic silver medalists for Finland
Olympic medalists in rowing
Medalists at the 2008 Summer Olympics
European Rowing Championships medalists
People from Lappeenranta
Sportspeople from South Karelia
21st-century Finnish women